Die Heimat was the title of a monthly journal that was published from 1891 to 2002 on the subject of the natural history and regional culture of Schleswig-Holstein and neighbouring regions. Since 2003, the journal has been called Natur- und Landeskunde: Zeitschrift für Schleswig-Holstein, Hamburg und Mecklenburg ("Natural History and Regional Culture: Journal for Schleswig-Holstein, Hamburg und Mecklenburg").

Editors 
 1891–1896: Heinrich Dannmeier (1852–1937)
 1897–1900: Heinrich Lund (1855–1916)
 1901–1911: Joachim Eckmann (1850–1922)
 1911–1914: Friedrich Lorentzen (1868–1914)
 1914–1917: Heinrich Barfod (1870–1917)
 1917–1920: Joachim Eckmann (1850–1922)
 1920–1943: Gustav Friedrich Meyer (1878–1945)
 1947: Reinhold Stolze (1890– )
 1947–1963: Willi Christiansen (1885– )
 1963–1973: Nicolaus Detlefsen (1897– )
 1974–1978: Christian Radke
 since 1979: Wolfgang Riedel

Publishers 
The publishing society has changed its name three times during its history:
 Verein zur Pflege der Natur- und Landeskunde in Schleswig-Holstein, Hamburg, Lübeck und dem Fürstentum Lübeck
 Verein zur Pflege der Natur- und Landeskunde in Schleswig-Holstein, Hamburg und Lübeck
 Verein zur Pflege der Natur- und Landeskunde in Schleswig-Holstein und Hamburg
 Verein zur Pflege der Natur- und Landeskunde in Schleswig-Holstein, Hamburg und Mecklenburg - Die Heimat

External links 

 Reference data in the State Bibliography of Mecklenburg-Vorpommern
 Link to the journal

Academic journals published in Germany
Folklore magazines
Culture of Schleswig-Holstein
Magazines published in Hamburg
Culture of Mecklenburg-Western Pomerania
History of Schleswig-Holstein
19th century in Hamburg
Culture in Lübeck
History of Mecklenburg-Western Pomerania
Magazines established in 1891